Michael John Weir (born 18 February 1991) is a footballer who plays as a defender for St. Paul's.

Club career
Weir spent two years with the Southampton academy between 2004 and 2006 before agreeing a two-year scholarship deal with Portuguese side Nacional in March 2008. After two years, Weir spent two seasons out on loan at Campeonato de Portugal side Camacha. In May 2012, Weir joined Cypriot top-flight side Doxa. In the summer of 2014, Weir joined Spanish side Ontinyent, playing two league matches before leaving the club in October.

International career
Weir represented Jersey at the 2009 Island Games, playing three matches on the way to winning the gold medal in the men's football competition. In 2018, whilst playing for St. Paul's, Weir was called up to the new Parishes of Jersey football team for their fixture against Yorkshire.

References

External links
 

1991 births
Living people
Jersey footballers
Association football defenders
Southampton F.C. players
C.D. Nacional players
Doxa Katokopias FC players
Bognor Regis Town F.C. players
Dulwich Hamlet F.C. players
Cypriot First Division players
Ontinyent CF players
Tercera División players
Campeonato de Portugal (league) players
Expatriate footballers in Portugal
Expatriate footballers in Cyprus
Expatriate footballers in Spain